Vikram Singh Rao II Puar (born 3 May 1989), is the present titular and the 10th Maharaja of Dewas Senior . He is a descendant of the Maratha Puar (Pawar) dynasty.  He ascended the 'Gadi' of Dewas Senior as the Maharaja, after the death of his father late HH Maharaja Tukoji Rao IV Puar at the Anand Bhawan Palace, Dewas. His mother Gayatri Raje Puar represents Dewas in Madhya Pradesh assembly, having won the election in 2018.

See also
List of Maratha dynasties and states
Maratha Empire
Maratha
Dhar State
Dewas Junior
Dewas Senior
Dhar State

Hemendra Singh Rao Pawar

References

Maharajas of Madhya Pradesh
1989 births
People from Dewas
People from Madhya Pradesh
Living people
The Daly College Alumni